Island City is a city in Union County, Oregon, United States. Its name originated from the city's location on an island between the Grande Ronde River and a nearby slough. However, the slough was later diverted, removing the city's island status. The population was 989 at the 2010 census.

Community
A Boise Cascade particle board plant existed near Island City.

The Lighthouse Pentecostal Church is located in Island City, and was the site of a community COVID-19 outbreak over the weekend of June 13-14, 2020. By June 16 there were 236 cases linked to the church due to a wedding that weekend. It was noted that the church held in-person services without social distancing or masks in April and as late as May 24, and the church had also held a wedding and a graduation, each attended by over 100 people.

Geography
Island City lies at the intersection of Oregon Route 82 and Oregon Route 237 on the northeastern outskirts of La Grande.

Demographics

2010 census
At the 2010 census, there were 989 people, 399 households and 298 families living in the city. The racial make-up was 94.7% White, 0.1% African American, 0.6% Native American, 0.5% Asian, 0.8% Pacific Islander, 0.9% from other races, and 2.3% from two or more races. Hispanic or Latino of any race were 3.4% of the population.

There were 399 households, of which 29.6% had children under the age of 18 living with them. 62.2% were married couples living together, 10.0% had a female householder with no husband present, 2.5% had a male householder with no wife present and 25.3% were non-families. 21.3% of all households were made up of individuals, and 10.8% had someone living alone who was 65 years of age or older. The average household size was 2.45 and the average family size was 2.81.

The median age was 43.5 years. 23.8% of residents were under the age of 18; 6.2% were between the ages of 18 and 24; 22.4% were from 25 to 44; 27.3% were from 45 to 64; and 20.6% were 65 years of age or older. The gender make-up was 49.4% male and 50.6% female.

2000 census
At the 2000 census, there were 916 people, 357 households and 280 families living in the city. The population density was 1,055.3 per square mile (406.5/km). There were 375 housing units at an average density of 432.0 per square mile (166.4/km). The racial make-up  was 95.41% White, 0.22% African American, 1.20% Native American, 0.76% Asian, 0.33% Pacific Islander, 1.09% from other races, and 0.98% from two or more races. Hispanic or Latino of any race were 2.07% of the population.

There were 357 households, of which 31.9% had children under the age of 18 living with them, 70.6% were married couples living together, 6.4% had a female householder with no husband present, and 21.3% were non-families. 17.9% of all households were made up of individuals, and 9.2% had someone living alone who was 65 years of age or older. The average household size was 2.57 and the average family size was 2.87.

23.7% of the population were under the age of 18, 7.1% from 18 to 24, 24.7% from 25 to 44, 28.2% from 45 to 64, and 16.4% who were 65 years of age or older. The median age was 42 years. For every 100 females, there were 98.3 males. For every 100 females age 18 and over, there were 94.2 males.

The median household income was $43,977 and the median family income was $49,327. Males had a median income of $39,250 and females $20,486. The per capita income was $19,138. About 3.3% of families and 5.9% of the population were below the poverty line, including 3.9% of those under age 18 and 9.3% of those age 65 or over.

References

External links
 Entry for Island City in the Oregon Blue Book
 Island City government site

Cities in Oregon
Cities in Union County, Oregon
1904 establishments in Oregon
Populated places established in 1904